William Mág Tighearnán (anglicised William McKiernan) was chief of the McKiernan Clan of Tullyhunco, County Cavan from 1499 until his death in 1512.

Chieftainship

On the death of the previous chief, John Mág Tighearnán in 1499, William took the chieftaincy and resided in the castle of Croaghan of the Cups (Irish- Cruachan O'Cúbhrán), now in the townland of Coolnashinny, besides the modern town of Killeshandra.

Death

William died in 1512.

The Annals of the Four Masters for 1512 state-

Mac Tiernan of Teallach-Dunchadha (William) died.

References

Irish lords
1512 deaths
People from County Cavan
16th-century Irish people